Phillip Thomas McSorley (1898-1970) was an Australian rugby league footballer who played as a  or  in the 1920s.

Playing career
McSorley came to the St. George club from Crookwell, New South Wales and stayed for 4 successful seasons playing five-eighth or centre. He later coached St. George's Third Grade team to a premiership, became a selector and a committeeman.

Death
McSorley died at Narwee, New South Wales on 31 January 1970.

References

1898 births
1970 deaths
Australian rugby league administrators
Australian rugby league players
Rugby league centres
Rugby league five-eighths
Rugby league players from New South Wales
St. George Dragons players